Scott Sterling (born February 2, 1972) is an American professional golfer.

Sterling was born in Beaumont, Texas. He played college golf at Louisiana State University where he was an All-American in 1994. He turned professional in 1995.

Sterling has played mainly on the Nationwide Tour and PGA Tour since 1999. On the Nationwide Tour (1999, 2002–05, 2007, 2010–2012), he has won once, at the 2007 Jacob's Creek Open Championship. On the PGA Tour (2008–09), his best finish is T-6 at the 2008 Children's Miracle Network Classic. He has also played on the NGA Hooters Tour, winning the 2001 NGA Hooters Tour Championship.

Professional wins (2)

PGA Tour of Australasia wins (1)

1Co-sanctioned by the Nationwide Tour

Nationwide Tour wins (1)

1Co-sanctioned by the PGA Tour of Australasia

Other wins (1)
2001 NGA Hooters Tour Championship

See also
2007 Nationwide Tour graduates

References

External links

American male golfers
LSU Tigers golfers
PGA Tour golfers
Korn Ferry Tour graduates
Golfers from Texas
Golfers from Louisiana
Sportspeople from Beaumont, Texas
Sportspeople from Baton Rouge, Louisiana
1972 births
Living people